{{infobox
| title      = Mexico national American football team
| image      = 
| label2     = Seudónimo
| data2      = El Tri
| label3     = Federación
| data3      = Mexican American Football Federation
| label4     = Confederación
| data4      = PAFAF
| label5     = Region
| data5      = North America
| label6     = Colors
| data6      = Green, White & Red  
| label7     = Uniforms
| data7      = 
| label8     = Head coach
| data8      = Raul Rivera Sanchez
| header9   = First international
| data10     =  89–0 (Palermo, Italy; 27 June 1999)
| header11   = Biggest win
| data12     =  89–0 (Palermo, Italy; 27 June 1999)
| header13   = Biggest defeat
| data14     =  6–30 (Canton, Ohio, United States; 9 July 2015)
| header15   = IFAF World Championship
| label16    = Appearances
| data16     = 4 (first in 1999)
| label17    = Best result
| data17     = Runner-up (1999, 2003)
| header18   = IFAF U-19 World Cup
| label19    = Appearances
| data19     = 2 (first in 2009)
| label20    = Best result
| data20     = Third (2014)
}}

The Mexico national American football team (Spanish: Selección de fútbol americano de México) represents Mexico in international American football competitions. The team is controlled by the Mexican American Football Federation. Mexico has participated in competitions such as the Aztec Bowl, the IFAF World Cup, and the IFAF Junior World Cup.

Mexico finished second place in both the 1999 and 2003 IFAF World Cup, losing both times to  Japan. They did not participate in the 2007 Cup, but returned to competition in the 2011 Cup. They qualified for the 2015 Cup.

The selected players are usually from teams in ONEFA, Mexico's main college football league.

 Best results 

IFAF World Championship record

NFL Global Junior Championship
 
 1997 :  Gold medal. 
 1998 :  Gold medal. 
 1999 :  Silver medal. 
 2003 :  Bronze medal. 
 2004 :  Bronze medal. 
 2005 :  Bronze medal. 
 2007 :  Bronze medal.

Mexico's junior team competed in the  2009 IFAF Junior World Cup in Canton, Ohio from 27 June to 5 July 2009.

IFAF Junior World Cup
 2009 : 4 place. 
 2012 : Did Not Participate''
 2014 :  Bronze medal.

World University American Football Championship
 2014 :  Gold medal.
 2016 :  Gold medal.

See also
Liga de Fútbol Americano Profesional
ONEFA
CONADEIP

References

Men's national American football teams
American football
American football in Mexico
IFAF Americas
American football teams in Mexico